Mimi Belete Gebregeiorges (born 9 June 1988) is an Ethiopian-born middle and long-distance runner who competes internationally for Bahrain. She won the 5000 metres title at the 2010 Asian Games.

She moved to Belgium as a political refugee along with her younger sister, Almensh Belete, who is also a runner. It was in Belgium that she began competing: she ran at the 2007 Memorial van Damme in Brussels and was the 2009 winner of the Eurocross competition. She chose to transfer allegiance to Bahrain in early 2009 and her first outing for her newly adopted country was at the Asian Cross Country Championships, where she took the silver medal behind fellow convert Maryam Yusuf Jamal. She ran at the 2009 IAAF World Cross Country Championships in March and finished in 28th place. She also qualified for the 1500 metres at the 2009 World Championships in Athletics and reached the semi-finals of the event. At the end of the year she set indoor bests at the 2009 Asian Indoor Games, taking fourth place in the 800 metres and taking the runner-up spot in the 1500 metres behind Liu Qing.

She started her 2010 with a defence of her title at the Eurocross before going on to take 16th place at the 2010 IAAF World Cross Country Championships in Bydgoszcz. She improved her 3000 metres best with a fourth-place finish in 8:32.18 at the Herculis IAAF Diamond League meeting in July, and a month later she ran a personal best of 4:00.25 for the 1500 m, taking second place behind Jamal at the Rieti Meeting. She was selected to represent the Asia-Pacific team at the 2010 IAAF Continental Cup and came in fourth place in the 1500 m. Belete won two medals at the 2010 Asian Games in November. She made a team effort with Jamal in the 1500 m and ended up with the bronze medal as Truong Thanh Hang edged her near the finish. Running in the 5000 m, she managed to fend off an Indian challenge in the form of Preeja Sreedharan and Kavita Raut to secure the gold medal in a personal best of 15:15.59 minutes, completing her first major title win.

On October 12, 2018, she won the Toronto Waterfront Marathon, with a course record time and personal best of 2:22:28.

Competition record

Other notable races
Key:

References

1988 births
Living people
Bahraini female middle-distance runners
Ethiopian female middle-distance runners
Bahraini female long-distance runners
Ethiopian female long-distance runners
Olympic athletes of Bahrain
Athletes (track and field) at the 2012 Summer Olympics
Athletes (track and field) at the 2016 Summer Olympics
Asian Games medalists in athletics (track and field)
Athletes (track and field) at the 2010 Asian Games
Athletes (track and field) at the 2014 Asian Games
World Athletics Championships athletes for Bahrain
Bahraini people of Ethiopian descent
Ethiopian emigrants to Bahrain
Naturalized citizens of Bahrain
Asian Games gold medalists for Bahrain
Asian Games silver medalists for Bahrain
Asian Games bronze medalists for Bahrain
Medalists at the 2010 Asian Games
Medalists at the 2014 Asian Games